Aurorasaurus is a citizen science project which tracks auroras with social media, namely Twitter and Facebook, but largely with its mobile app. The project was created by Liz MacDonald, a space physicist at NASA Goddard Space Flight Center in Greenbelt, Maryland, after a 2011 solar storm produced red auroras visible from Alabama, whereupon she enlisted people as aurora observers using social media. It receives funding from the National Science Foundation. The sheer ubiquity of smartphones in particular has made them a modern version of pioneering aurora scientist Victor Hessler's bell; reportage of the heretofore undescribed unusual atmospheric optical phenomenon dubbed "Steve" went viral.

See also
 Atypical auroras

References

External links
 
 

Citizen science
Atmospheric optical phenomena